The 2012–13 season was Manchester United's 21st season in the Premier League, and their 38th consecutive season in the top flight of English football.

United's season began on 20 August 2012 with the first game of the Premier League campaign. After narrowly missing out on goal difference the previous season, they won an unprecedented 20th English top-flight title on 22 April 2013 with a win over Aston Villa at Old Trafford, in which top scorer Robin van Persie scored a hat-trick, finishing the season with 26 league goals and 30 goals in all competitions.

United competed in two domestic cups, the FA Cup and the League Cup, where they entered both tournaments in the Third Round courtesy of their league position. Chelsea proved to be United's nemesis in both competitions, first beating them 5–4 in the Fourth Round of the League Cup on 31 October 2012, followed by a 1–0 win in the FA Cup Sixth Round Replay on 1 April 2013.

In Europe, United were knocked out of the Champions League at the Round of 16 stage after losing 3–2 on aggregate to Real Madrid.

On 8 May 2013, United's long time manager, Sir Alex Ferguson announced that he would retire from his position as manager of Manchester United after  years in charge, making him the longest-serving manager of any English club by this stage. He had won 38 trophies during that time – more than any other manager in the history of football – and at 71 was the oldest serving manager currently in the Premier League or Football League.

The next day, Manchester United announced that David Moyes of Everton would take over from Ferguson at the beginning of the 2013–14 season.

Pre-season and friendlies
Manchester United preceded their 2012–13 campaign with a global tour, including trips to South Africa for the first time since 2008, China for the first time since 2009 and Norway for the first time since 2002. The tour began with matches against South African teams AmaZulu on 18 July 2012 and Ajax Cape Town on 21 July 2012. They then travelled to China to play Shanghai Shenhua on 25 July 2012 at the Shanghai Stadium, before moving on to Norway to play Vålerenga at the Ullevaal Stadion in Oslo on 5 August, and Sweden to play Spanish side Barcelona at Ullevi, Gothenburg, on 8 August 2012. The final game of the pre-season tour was against Hannover 96 (whom they had not played since 1965) at the AWD-Arena on 11 August 2012.

Premier League

The fixtures for the 2012–13 league season were announced on 18 June at 09:00 BST.

United's first game was away from home at Goodison Park to Everton on 20 August 2012, a game that they lost to a goal by Marouane Fellaini in the 57th minute. It was United's first Premier League opening game defeat since 2004.

United then returned to Old Trafford where they played against Fulham. The game started with Fulham taking the lead in third minute through a Damien Duff goal, a goal which marked Fulham's first goal at Old Trafford since 2006. United levelled the game seven minutes later through a spectacular volley from Robin van Persie who scored his first goal for United after joining the team a week before. United then took the lead in the 35th minute through Shinji Kagawa who, like Van Persie, scored his first United goal. Rafael made the scoreline 3–1 just five minutes before half-time. In the second-half Fulham managed to reduce United's lead after an own goal by United defender Nemanja Vidić, who collided with goalkeeper David de Gea and back-heeled the ball into the net.

United's next game was against Southampton, and Southampton took shock 1–0 and 2–1 goal leads through Rickie Lambert and Morgan Schneiderlin before a Van Persie hat-trick saved United at the death after he earlier missed a penalty. In the next game, United thrashed Wigan 4–0 with summer signings Alexander Büttner and Nick Powell scoring their first goals. Hernández and Scholes also got on the scoresheet. United's next game was against archrivals Liverpool. Liverpool took the lead but United fought back with goals from Rafael and a penalty from Van Persie and won the game 2–1. United then suffered a 3–2 loss at the hands of Tottenham. Tottenham took a 2–0 lead. At half-time, Wayne Rooney made his return and contributed with an assist, but Tottenham held on take victory.

The next match saw Manchester United win 3–0 against Newcastle United at St James' Park. Goals from Jonny Evans and Patrice Evra, both headed from corners gave United a 2–0 lead before Tom Cleverley scored a curling screamer from 25 yards. The next match saw United win 4–2 against Stoke City, Wayne Rooney scored an own goal in the 11th minute before equalising in the 28th minute. Van Persie gave United the lead just before the break, and Danny Welbeck's diving header gave United a two-goal advantage before Michael Kightly cut the margin in the 58th minute. Seven minutes later, Wayne Rooney scored to restore Man Utd's two-goal lead and win the game 4–2.

United then played title rivals Chelsea at Stamford Bridge, a stadium where they had not won in the past 10 years. In the first 12 minutes United struck twice. The first was a David Luiz own goal after Robin van Persie's shot hit the post and bounced off the Brazilian, and then the Dutchman himself scored the second. Juan Mata scored for Chelsea just before half time, and Ramires equalised for the hosts ten minutes after the break. Branislav Ivanović was shown the red card for a foul near the area, and nine minutes later Fernando Torres received a second yellow for diving. Substitute Hernández scored the goal that saw the visitors emerge victorious.

The next game was at Old Trafford against rivals Arsenal, in which Van Persie scored against his former club within three minutes of the start. Wayne Rooney missed a penalty just before half time, but Patrice Evra doubled United's lead after heading Rooney's cross into the net. Arsenal pulled a goal back in the final minute via Santi Cazorla. An away visit to Aston Villa turned out to be a thrilling game which saw United fall two goals behind from Andreas Weimann before substitute Hernández scored twice and assisted an own goal that gave United the victory.

United suffered their third defeat of the season away to Norwich City, falling to a single goal from former Manchester United youth Anthony Pilkington. United then entertained Queens Park Rangers and fell behind after 52 minutes. However, they responded strongly with Jonny Evans and Darren Fletcher both netting from Wayne Rooney corners. Hernández scored the third goal to make the points safe. United then had visiting West Ham United as their next rivals. United won the match 1–0 thanks to an early Van Persie goal after just 31 seconds that deflected over Jussi Jääskeläinen.

United established a three-point lead over their closest rivals Manchester City after edging a seven-goal thriller against Reading at Madejski Stadium. Hal Robson-Kanu lashed home the opener, then Anderson cracked in an equaliser and Wayne Rooney slid home a penalty before Adam Le Fondre and Sean Morrison quickly headed in from corners to have the hosts 3–2 up by 23 minutes. Despite the defensive lapses, Manchester United fought back through an irresistible attacking display, and Rooney clinically turned in Patrice Evra's cross to level again, before turning provider for Robin van Persie to spring the hosts' offside trap and beat Adam Federici to make it 3–4 in 34 minutes. United held on to the lead in a nervous second half to win the match.

United then played city rivals and closest contenders Manchester City at the Etihad Stadium. Wayne Rooney scored two goals in the first half hour to give United a two-goal cushion. But the match looked to have turned completely with half an hour left as Ashley Young had a goal wrongly ruled out for offside before Yaya Touré netted within seconds. It allowed the Blues to stage a comeback that led to Pablo Zabaleta levelling from a corner on 86 minutes. Incredibly, Van Persie, with a deflected free kick, had the final say in stoppage time to end City's unbeaten run at home that lasted almost two years and inflict their first league defeat since April 2012. In winning the match, United stretched the advantage at the summit to six points.

In their next match, United faced Sunderland at Old Trafford and goals from Robin van Persie and Tom Cleverley gave United a two-goal lead at half-time before Wayne Rooney gave United a three-goal advantage in the second half. Fraizer Campbell scored the only goal for the visitors, heading in Stéphane Sessègnon's cross. United held on to win the game 3–1. United then played Swansea City at the Liberty Stadium. Patrice Evra headed the Reds in front before Swansea striker Michu netted his 13th goal of the season in a see-sawing first half. The game ended at 1–1 – United's first draw of the season – but it was enough to ensure a lead of four points at the top of the table on Christmas Day.

Manchester United played Newcastle United at Old Trafford on Boxing Day in what turned out to be a classic. United conceded first when James Perch scored for Newcastle in the fourth minute. Jonny Evans then scored for both teams in quick succession, first equalising for United before putting through his own net to restore Newcastle's lead; the goal was originally ruled out for offside against Papiss Cissé, who was lurking behind Evans, but referee Mike Dean allowed it to stand, having deemed that Cissé was not interfering with play. Patrice Evra scored close to the hour mark to make the scores level with a 25-yard strike to mark his best season in terms of goals. Papiss Cissé then scored with a sublime finish to make it 3–2 on 68 minutes, only for Robin van Persie to get United's third equaliser three minutes later. Then United did what they do best with Javier Hernández dramatically scoring a winner with just seconds of the 90 minutes left to win the game 4–3. With Manchester City losing away at Sunderland, United extended their lead at the top to seven points.

United then played West Bromwich Albion at Old Trafford, making five changes to the side that played on Boxing Day with Shinji Kagawa returning to the side behind Danny Welbeck. Ashley Young's drilled cross was deflected off Gareth McAuley into his own net in the ninth minute for United's opener. Later in injury time, substitute Robin van Persie scored a wonderful curling shot assisted by Antonio Valencia to make it 2–0.

United then played Wigan Athletic at the DW Stadium, making three changes to the side that beat West Brom. Javier Hernández latched onto a rebound from Patrice Evra's shot and Robin van Persie rounded Iván Ramis and converted before half time. In the second half, Hernández smashed a volley after a blocked Van Persie free kick. Van Persie himself scored the fourth goal after receiving a short-driving cross from Danny Welbeck from the left hand side of the post to make it 4–0. The game was their fifth clean sheet in the league so far this season. United's next game was against arch-rivals Liverpool. Van Persie made it 1–0 and Evra's header which touched Vidić's head made it 2–0. Liverpool pulled one back but it was not enough. United then drew against Tottenham, Van Persie again opened the scoring with a header but Tottenham equalised in the dying moments of the game through Clint Dempsey.

In the next game, United played Southampton at home. After going 1–0 down within three minutes, United once again pulled it back with two goals from Wayne Rooney in the first half to win 2–1. After their midweek home win, United then travelled to London to play Fulham where the deadlock was finally broken by a goal from Rooney in the 79th minute. United held on for the 1–0 win to go nine points clear at the top of the table. United then capitalised on the defeat of their nearest neighbours and closest rivals at Southampton the day before by beating Everton 2–0 at Old Trafford to extend their lead at the top of the table to twelve points with goals from Ryan Giggs early in the first half and Van Persie just before half time and avenging the 1–0 defeat they suffered in their first match of the season.

After that Manchester United travelled to Loftus Road and had it easy with a 2–0 win over QPR where Rafael scored a 30-yard screamer and Giggs scored a clinical finish on his 999th appearance. This meant that Manchester United have opened up a 15-point lead, though this was reduced to 12 after Manchester City won 2–0 over Chelsea. Next, Manchester United hosted Norwich City at the "Theatre of Dreams" and again opened up a 15-point lead with a 4–0 win. Kagawa scored a hat-trick, becoming the first Asian player to do so in the Premier League.

On 16 March, Manchester United took advantage of their neighbours and closest title rivals Manchester City's loss to Everton earlier in the day by beating Reading. The game finished 1–0 from a deflected goal by Wayne Rooney after a surging run from Rio Ferdinand. This extended Manchester United's lead to 15 points with nine games to play. After the international break, United faced a trip to the Stadium of Light to play Sunderland on 30 March. Again United won 1–0 thanks to a Titus Bramble own goal after Van Persie's shot had deflected off him. By winning, United set a new record by winning 25 of their opening 30 games.

On 8 April, Manchester United returned to Old Trafford to play their second Manchester derby, where United were handed their first loss in 18 games after City won 2–1. James Milner scored the first for City with a deflected drive, but United equalised after Phil Jones headed a Van Persie free-kick against Vincent Kompany. Sergio Agüero, however, scored at the near post after a mazy run. United bounced back from derby disappointment by beating Stoke City at the Britannia Stadium. Michael Carrick scored a toe poke from a corner in the second minute and a late Van Persie penalty secured the points for United. Van Persie also ended his barren run of nine games without a goal.

Manchester United had to play a midweek fixture away to West Ham. This was a tough game that saw the hosts go ahead twice through Ricardo Vaz Tê and Mohamed Diamé. But United equalised twice through Antonio Valencia, who netted his first goal of the season, and Robin van Persie. The game ended 2–2.

On 22 April, Manchester United beat Aston Villa 3–0 to win their 13th Premier League title and 20th English championship after Manchester City had lost to Tottenham the day before. In the second minute, Robin van Persie scored after a lay-off from Ryan Giggs to make the score 1–0. Van Persie scored again in the 13th minute with a volley from a through ball over the top by Wayne Rooney. Sir Alex Ferguson and many others hailed it as one of the goals of the season. In the 33rd minute, Van Persie completed his hat-trick with another assist from Giggs. United clinched their 20th league title and Sir Alex Ferguson clinched his 13th title with United.

On 28 April, Manchester United travelled to the Emirates Stadium to face Arsenal. The home team gave United a guard of honour, but Van Persie received a torrid reception by his old fans. Arsenal scored first through a Theo Walcott goal in the second minute that was claimed to be offside. United scored at the end of the first half through a Van Persie penalty after the striker was fouled by Bacary Sagna. Both teams had chances to score in the second half but neither did and the score finished 1–1.

United then faced Chelsea at Old Trafford, recording their third-straight defeat to the Blues in the season after losing 1–0, courtesy of a Phil Jones own goal. A week later, Sir Alex Ferguson managed his last game at Old Trafford against Swansea. United took the lead through Javier Hernández, but conceded a strike from Michu in the 52nd minute. Quite oddly, it was Rio Ferdinand who scored the winner with three minutes to go, smashing home a Van Persie corner. Ferguson retired with dignity as he and his team received their medals.

Ferguson's last game in charge was against West Brom at The Hawthorns, taking a 5–2 lead with ten minutes to go. But they failed to hold on and conceded a 5–5 draw, setting a record for the first match in the Premier League for both teams to score five goals each.

FA Cup

United entered the FA Cup at the Third Round stage with the other Premier League clubs, as well as those from the Championship. The draw was made on 2 December 2012, with the ties taking place on the weekend of 5–6 January 2013. United was drawn in an away match against West Ham United. The game ended in a 2–2 draw which meant United had to play against West Ham United again, this time at Old Trafford on 16 January 2013, beating them 1–0 in the process.

The draw for the Fourth Round took place on 6 January 2013, and gave United a home match on 26 January against Fulham, which United won 4–1.

The draw for the Fifth Round took place on 27 January 2013, and gave United another home match, this time against fellow Premier League club Reading. The game which was played on 18 February 2013 gave United a 2–1 win.

The draw for the Sixth Round took place on 17 February 2013, and gave United another home match, this time against fellow Premier League club Chelsea. The game which was played on 10 March 2013 ended in a 2–2 draw which meant United had to play against Chelsea again, this time at Stamford Bridge on 1 April. The game finished with United losing 1–0, meaning that United were knocked out, with Chelsea proceeding to face Manchester City in the semi-finals.

League Cup

As one of seven English clubs who qualified for European competition in the 2011–12 season, United received a bye to the Third Round of the League Cup. The draw took place on 30 August 2012, with United being paired with fellow Premier League club Newcastle United. United defeated Newcastle 2–1 on 26 September. Later that day they were drawn against Chelsea for their Fourth Round match. A game they lost 5-4

UEFA Champions League

Group stage

Having finished in the top three in the league last season, United began their Champions League campaign in the group stage. Courtesy of their UEFA coefficient, they were seeded in Pot 1 for the draw, which took place in Monaco on 30 August 2012. United were drawn into Group H, along with Braga of Portugal, Turkish champions Galatasaray and Romanian champions CFR Cluj. Manchester United were previously drawn with Galatasaray in both 1993–94 and 1994–95, while Braga and CFR Cluj were new opponents.

United ensured qualification into the knockout stage on 7 November when they won away at Braga by a score of 3–1. United fell behind early in the second half when Braga was awarded a penalty as the result of a Jonny Evans challenge. Alan converted the penalty in the 49th minute to put the home side ahead. The match was halted for approximately 12 minutes due to the floodlights going out. When play resumed, Robin van Persie tied the match in the 80th minute with a long-range strike. United were then awarded a penalty in the 85th minute, which Wayne Rooney successfully converted. Javier Hernández then put the game away in stoppage time. With top spot in the group secured United, fielding younger squads, lost both of their final matches 1–0 to Galatasaray and CFR Cluj.

Knockout phase

The draw for the round of 16 was made in Nyon, Switzerland, on 20 December 2012. The first leg was played on 13 February 2013 away from home, and the second leg was played on 5 March 2013 at Old Trafford. As winners of their group, United were drawn against defending Spanish league champions, Real Madrid, who finished as runners-up in Group D. It was fifth tie between the two famed clubs and the first time they have faced one another since 2003 when Real Madrid won the quarter-final tie 6–5 on aggregate. This also marked the first time United faced Cristiano Ronaldo since selling him to Madrid in 2009 for a record £80 million. In the first tie, United drew 1–1 away from home thanks to a goal by Danny Welbeck. In the second tie, United lost 2–1 at home to Real Madrid after a red card was handed to United player Nani for going in with his foot at chest height in the 56th minute. Cristiano Ronaldo scored against his former club in both ties.

Squad statistics

Statistics accurate as of 19 May 2013

Transfers

In

Out

Loan out

Notes

References

Manchester United F.C. seasons
English football championship-winning seasons
Manchester United
Manchester United